is a former Japanese football player. He played for Japan national team.

Club career
Kikuhara was born in Kanagawa Prefecture on July 7, 1969. He joined the Yomiuri (later Verdy Kawasaki) youth team in 1985. In February 1986, he debuted in the Japan Soccer League when he was 16 years old. The club won the league championship three times, the JSL Cup twice, and the Emperor's Cup twice. In Asia, the club also won the 1987 Asian Club Championship. In 1992, the Japan Soccer League was dissolved and the new league J1 League was formed. The club won the 1993 J.League and the 1992 and 1993 J.League Cups. However, he gradually played less often. So he moved to the Urawa Reds in 1994. He returned to Verdy Kawasaki in 1996 and retired at the end of the season.

National team career
On July 29, 1990, Kikuhara debuted for Japan national team against China. He also played at 1990 Asian Games. He played 5 games for Japan in 1990.

Club statistics

National team statistics

References

External links

Japan National Football Team Database

1969 births
Living people
Chuo University alumni
Association football people from Kanagawa Prefecture
Japanese footballers
Japan international footballers
Japan Soccer League players
J1 League players
Tokyo Verdy players
Urawa Red Diamonds players
Footballers at the 1990 Asian Games
Association football midfielders
Asian Games competitors for Japan
Guangzhou City F.C. non-playing staff